The Copper Box Arena is a multi-sport venue built for the 2012 Summer Olympics, located in the Queen Elizabeth Olympic Park in London, England.

Previously known as the Handball Arena, it was renamed because, aside from handball, it hosted modern pentathlon (fencing, shooting, swimming, horse jumping and running) during the Olympics and was the goalball venue for the 2012 Summer Paralympics.

History
London's Olympic bid proposed that there would be four indoor arenas in the Olympic Park, in addition to other main venues, but the revised masterplan published in 2006 reduced this to three, with the volleyball being moved to Earls Court Exhibition Centre. The fencing arena was also cancelled, and the fencing took place at ExCeL. Construction of the building was completed on time in early 2011 and came in under budget. The design incorporates light pipes and rainwater collectors to reduce both energy and water use by 40%. Test events were successfully hosted at the venue ahead of the Olympic and Paralympic Games in 2012.

In January 2012, the venue was renamed the Copper Box from the Handball Arena, thus reflecting the look of the building and the fact that it would not just be used for Handball. British Handball campaigned for the rebrand to be reversed.

Olympics

The Copper Box has 7,000 seats. It was used for handball preliminaries and modern pentathlon fencing during the Olympic Games, and for goalball during the Paralympic Games. The handball men's quarter-finals, all semi-finals and both finals were held at the larger Basketball Arena.

The Copper Box was praised for its loud, exciting atmosphere during handball games. For the Paralympics goalball events the crowd in the Box must be quiet.

Post-Olympics
The venue has been adapted into a multi-sport arena for community use, athlete training and major events.

British Basketball League side London Lions relocated to the Copper Box for the 2013–14 season. They played their first game there on 14 August 2013 in front of a sell-out crowd, losing 72–107 to the Iowa Hawkeyes American college basketball team in an exhibition match. The Lions' women's team, playing in the WBBL, moved to the venue in 2017.

The venue played host to the 2015 Netball Superleague Grand Final, which saw the Surrey Storm win their first Netball Superleague title, defeating the Hertfordshire Mavericks, 56–39. The venue is the home arena for the London Pulse, who since 2018 have played in the Superleague. It has also hosted several home test matches for the England national team.

The Copper Box hosted the London Grand Prix badminton tournament on 1–6 October 2013. The London Grand Prix forms part of the Badminton World Federation's Grand Prix Gold series.

The Wheelchair Rugby event at the 2014 Invictus Games was held at the venue in September 2014, as was the BT World Wheelchair Rugby Challenge in October 2015.

London GD Handball Club, one of the oldest handball clubs in the country, used the venue for its home matches.

The floor was badly damaged during a mass fitness event in January 2014, resulting in several netball internationals having to be played elsewhere at the last minute.

Counter-Strike: Global Offensive and Super Smash Bros. Melee DreamHack London 2015 took place at the Copper Box on 19–20 September.

On 3 February 2018, the Copper Box hosted the amateur boxing fight between YouTubers KSI and Joe Weller. It has also hosted IBF boxing.

From 22 to 25 February 2018, the venue played host to the ITTF Team World Cup table tennis competition.

The Rocket League Championship Series Season 5 World Championship, an Esports event sponsored by Psyonix, the video game company who created Rocket League, was hosted there on 8–10 June 2018. The event was notable for "The Shot", in which Justin "jstn." Morales, a player on NRG, scored a last-second goal that forced overtime in game 7 of the World Championship Final. The RLCS would return to the Copper Box for the 2021-2022 season Spring Major on 29th June–3rd July 2022, with crowds only being present on the final two days.

Great Britain played Kazakhstan at the arena in April 2019, in the tennis Fed Cup World Group II play-offs.

On 31 August 2019, the venue was used for New Japan Pro-Wrestling's show in the United Kingdom, Royal Quest.

From 14 to 16 November 2019 the venue hosted X0, an annual event presented by Xbox.

Between January and July 2020, the Copper Box Arena was used as the home venue for the London Royal Ravens, an eSports team taking part in the inaugural Call of Duty League.

The Apex Legends Global Series Year 3 Split 1 finals, will be hosted there on 2-5 Feb 2023.

The arena was one of the three venues selected to host matches in the 2021 Wheelchair Rugby League World Cup.

References

External links

Queen Elizabeth Olympic Park website
Gym and fitness centre website
 London 2012 Olympics profile 
Make Architects website

Venues of the 2012 Summer Olympics
Handball venues in the United Kingdom
Indoor arenas in London
Olympic fencing venues
Olympic handball venues
Olympic modern pentathlon venues
Handball at the 2012 Summer Olympics
Queen Elizabeth Olympic Park
2012 Summer Paralympic venues
Badminton in England
Badminton venues
Boxing venues in the United Kingdom
Hackney, London
Hackney Wick
Netball venues in England